Saint-Jean-Vianney was a village in the Saguenay-Lac-Saint-Jean region of Quebec, which was abandoned after it was partially destroyed in a landslide on May 4, 1971.

History
Saint-Jean-Vianney was originally created as a parish municipality in 1935, and became a village on December 29, 1951. By 1971, the village had a population of 1,266.

Landslide

Located near the shore of the Saguenay River, Saint-Jean-Vianney was — unbeknownst to residents at the time — built atop a bed of unstable Leda clay, a type of subsoil which can liquefy under stress.

Following unusually heavy rains in April 1971, the clay soil bed at Saint-Jean-Vianney became saturated with water that had failed to run off, causing pockets of clay to gradually dissolve. Over the few weeks leading up to the landslide, cracks were reported in some of the town's streets and driveways, some house foundations dropped roughly six to eight inches (15 to 20 cm) into the soil, and some unusual noises — including underground thumps and an untraceable sound of running water — were reported.

Just before midnight, the clay finally stopped flowing and began to resolidify. By the time the landslide had ended, 41 homes had been destroyed and 31 people had been killed.

Aftermath
The Saint-Jean-Vianney site was subsequently declared unsafe for habitation, and over the next six months the survivors were resettled at Arvida. Through various municipal amalgamations, both the landslide site and Arvida are now within the municipal boundaries of Saguenay.

Subsequent research into the slide revealed that Saint-Jean-Vianney was in fact built directly atop the site of another landslide approximately 500 years earlier, long before any settlement had ever taken place in the area.

The site of Saint-Jean-Vianney remains uninhabited today, although a small park near Shipshaw and a museum exhibit at Saguenay's Place du Presbytère commemorate the event. Place du Presbytère also includes an exhibit dedicated to the Saguenay Flood of 1996.

See also
 Lemieux, Ontario, where a disaster was averted by resettling the town two years prior to a similar landslide

External links
 Satellite image of Saint-Jean-Vianney townsite on Google Maps
 Saint-Jean-Vianney
  History of Saint-Jean-Vianney landslide 
 Saint-Jean-Vianney Landslide | CBC archives

1935 establishments in Quebec
1971 disestablishments in Quebec
Ghost towns in Quebec
Natural disaster ghost towns
1971 in Canada
Natural disasters in Quebec
Landslides in Canada
History of Saguenay, Quebec
Neighbourhoods in Saguenay, Quebec
Former municipalities in Quebec
Former villages in Canada
Landslides in 1971
Populated places disestablished in 1971
Forcibly depopulated communities in Canada
Destroyed towns